O'Shea Jackson Jr.  (born February 24, 1991) is an American actor and rapper. He is the oldest son of Ice Cube and, in his feature film debut, portrayed his father in the 2015 biopic Straight Outta Compton.

Early life
O'Shea Jackson Jr. was born in Los Angeles, California, to O'Shea Jackson Sr., better known as Ice Cube, and Kimberly Woodruff. Jackson was raised in the San Fernando Valley, and is the first born of four children. He has two brothers, Darrell and Shareef, and a sister, Kareema. Darrell is also a rapper under the name Doughboy, which is the nickname of the character his father portrayed in his first film, Boyz n the Hood. Jackson attended William Howard Taft High School in Woodland Hills, California, from which he graduated in 2009. His father also attended Taft High School. Jackson graduated from the University of Southern California, where he studied screenwriting.

Career

Film
In June 2014, it was announced that Jackson had been cast to portray his father, Ice Cube, in Straight Outta Compton, a biographical film about N.W.A. The film was released on August 14, 2015, to positive reviews. Jackson is noted for his physical resemblance to his father, which Ice Cube described to Jimmy Kimmel in October 2014 as "spot-on. He was born to play the part."

In 2017, Jackson played Dan Pinto, the Batman-obsessed aspiring screenwriter, landlord and love interest of Aubrey Plaza's character Ingrid Thorburn in the film Ingrid Goes West, with many critics—including the Los Angeles Times, Vulture, and Collider—commenting on his scene-stealing abilities. In 2018, Jackson starred in the film Den of Thieves, which also included 50 Cent and Gerard Butler. 

Jackson appears in two May 2019 movies. He has a supporting role as Lance in the romantic comedy Long Shot alongside Charlize Theron and Seth Rogen, playing the best friend of Rogen's character. In Godzilla: King of the Monsters, he portrays Barnes, the leader of the G-Team, the special military forces group run specializing in battles involving Titans.

Also in 2019, Jackson co-starred with Michael B. Jordan, Jamie Foxx, and Brie Larson in the drama Just Mercy. He portrays Anthony Ray Hinton, who spent 30 years behind bars after being wrongfully convicted of murder.

After four years away from films, in 2023 he made his return in the dark comedy film Cocaine Bear as Daveed.

Music
In 2010, Jackson and his brother Darrell were featured on the songs "She Couldn't Make It On Her Own" and "Y'all Know How I Am", from their father's album I Am the West.

In March 2012, Jackson, under the name OMG, released his first mixtape, Jackin' for Beats, online.  Jazmine Gray of Vibe said, "True to its title, the hip-hop rookie offers his own lyrics over the beats of some of the most popular tracks of the year.  The 10-track tape finds the son of a hip hop icon off to a promising start."

In an interview with XXL Magazine, Jackson said that "Some people say I sound like OMG. No one has compared me or tried to match me up with other artists."

In 2015, Jackson appeared in Pia Mia's music video for her song "Touch". He also appeared in American hip hop duo Twenty88's music video, "Out of Love", promoting their self-titled debut extended play.

Television
On February 6, 2018, Jackson played hip hop legend Kool Herc in a segment of Drunk History. On October 4, 2019, Jackson made a guest appearance on the debut of WWE Smackdown on Fox.

Jackson will star opposite Dave Franco in the Quibi comedy series The Now. Release date is yet to be announced.

In the 2021 basketball drama show, Swagger, Jackson plays Ike Edwards, a former rising star who struggles to coach a young high-stake basketball team.  The series premiered on October 29, 2021 on Apple TV+.

He played Kawlan Roken in the Disney+ Star Wars series, Obi-Wan Kenobi.

Personal life
Jackson has a daughter, Jordan Reign Jackson, born in August 2017 with his ex-girlfriend, Jackie Garcia. He is a fan of professional wrestling.

Filmography

Film

Television

Discography

Guest appearances

References

External links
 
 

1991 births
21st-century American male actors
21st-century American rappers
African-American male actors
African-American male rappers
American male film actors
Jackson Jr., O'Shea
Living people
Male actors from Los Angeles
Rappers from Los Angeles
University of Southern California alumni
William Howard Taft Charter High School alumni